Katesh is a town in northern Tanzania. The town is located in Hanang District, Manyara Region. Paved trunk road T14 from Singida to Babati passes through the town.

According to the 2012 census, the population of Katesh ward is 8,774.

The main ascent to nearby Mount Hanang starts in Katesh.

References

Wards of Manyara Region
Populated places in Manyara Region